Hasan Izz-Al-Din (born about 1963) is a Lebanese national wanted by the United States government.

Criminal background
Hasan Izz-Al-Din is an alleged  member of Hezbollah. He is currently wanted by the United States government for his alleged involvement in the June 14, 1985 hijacking of TWA Flight 847. This attack resulted in the death of United States Navy diver Robert Stethem. On October 10, 2001, Izz-Al-Din, along with two other alleged participants in the hijacking, was placed on the initial list of the FBI's top 22 Most Wanted Terrorists, which was released to the public by President George W. Bush. A reward of 5 million dollars is currently being offered for information leading to his arrest and conviction. It is believed he is residing in Lebanon.

See also
Ali Atwa
Imad Mugniyah
List of fugitives from justice who disappeared

References

External links
 Rewards for Justice Site
 Izz-Al-Din profile at FBI Most Wanted Terrorist Site

1963 births
FBI Most Wanted Terrorists
Fugitives wanted by the United States
Fugitives wanted on terrorism charges
Hezbollah hijackers
Individuals designated as terrorists by the United States government
Lebanese Islamists
Living people